Sattar Mahmoudi is an Iranian engineer, politician and former acting Minister of Energy of Iran, a position he has held from 20 August 2017 until 29 October 2017. He is also Vice Minister of Energy, a position he has held since 2014.

References 

Living people
Iranian engineers
Iranian Vice Ministers
Year of birth missing (living people)